In proof theory, ordinal analysis assigns ordinals (often large countable ordinals) to mathematical theories as a measure of their strength. 
If theories have the same proof-theoretic ordinal they are often equiconsistent, and if one theory has a larger proof-theoretic ordinal than another it can often prove the consistency of the second theory.

History 
The field of ordinal analysis was formed when Gerhard Gentzen in 1934 used cut elimination to prove, in modern terms, that the proof-theoretic ordinal of Peano arithmetic is ε0. See Gentzen's consistency proof.

Definition
Ordinal analysis concerns true, effective (recursive) theories that can interpret a sufficient portion of arithmetic to make statements about ordinal notations. 

The proof-theoretic ordinal of such a theory  is the supremum of the order types of all ordinal notations (necessarily recursive, see next section) that the theory can prove are well founded—the supremum of all ordinals  for which there exists a notation  in Kleene's sense such that  proves that  is an ordinal notation.

Ordinal notations
Some theories, such as subsystems of second-order arithmetic, have no conceptualization of or way to make arguments about transfinite ordinals. For example, to formalize what it means for a subsystem of Z2  to "prove  well-ordered", we instead construct an ordinal notation  with order type .  can now work with various transfinite induction principles along , which substitute for reasoning about set-theoretic ordinals.

However, some pathological notation systems exist that are unexpectedly difficult to work with. For example, Rathjen gives a primitive recursive notation system  that is well-founded iff PA is consistent, despite having order type  - including such a notation in the ordinal analysis of PA would result in the false equality .

Upper bound
For any theory that's both -axiomatizable and -sound, the existence of a recursive ordering that the theory fails to prove is well-ordered follows from the  bounding theorem, and said provably well-founded ordinal notations are in fact well-founded by -soundness. Thus the proof-theoretic ordinal of a -sound theory that has a  axiomatization will always be a (countable) recursive ordinal, that is, less than the Church–Kleene ordinal .

Examples

Theories with proof-theoretic ordinal ω
Q, Robinson arithmetic (although the definition of the proof-theoretic ordinal for such weak theories has to be tweaked).
PA–, the first-order theory of the nonnegative part of a discretely ordered ring.

Theories with proof-theoretic ordinal ω2
RFA, rudimentary function arithmetic.
IΔ0, arithmetic with induction on Δ0-predicates without any axiom asserting that exponentiation is total.

Theories with proof-theoretic ordinal ω3
EFA, elementary function arithmetic.
IΔ0 + exp, arithmetic with induction on Δ0-predicates augmented by an axiom asserting that exponentiation is total.
RCA, a second order form of EFA sometimes used in reverse mathematics.
WKL, a second order form of EFA sometimes used in reverse mathematics.

Friedman's grand conjecture suggests that much "ordinary" mathematics can be proved in weak systems having this as their proof-theoretic ordinal.

Theories with proof-theoretic ordinal ωn (for n = 2, 3, ... ω)
IΔ0 or EFA augmented by an axiom ensuring that each element of the n-th level  of the Grzegorczyk hierarchy is total.

Theories with proof-theoretic ordinal ωω
RCA0, recursive comprehension.
WKL0, weak König's lemma.
PRA, primitive recursive arithmetic.
IΣ1, arithmetic with induction on Σ1-predicates.

Theories with proof-theoretic ordinal ε0
PA, Peano arithmetic (shown by Gentzen using cut elimination).
ACA0, arithmetical comprehension.

Theories with proof-theoretic ordinal the Feferman–Schütte ordinal Γ0
ATR0, arithmetical transfinite recursion.
Martin-Löf type theory with arbitrarily many finite level universes.

This ordinal is sometimes considered to be the upper limit for "predicative" theories.

Theories with proof-theoretic ordinal the Bachmann–Howard ordinal
 ID1, the first theory of inductive definitions.
 KP, Kripke–Platek set theory with the axiom of infinity.
 CZF, Aczel's constructive Zermelo–Fraenkel set theory.
 EON, a weak variant of the Feferman's explicit mathematics system T0.

The Kripke-Platek or CZF set theories are weak set theories without axioms for the full powerset given as set of all subsets. Instead, they tend to either have axioms of restricted separation and formation of new sets, or they grant existence of certain function spaces (exponentiation) instead of carving them out from bigger relations.

Theories with larger proof-theoretic ordinals

, Π11 comprehension has a rather large proof-theoretic ordinal, which was described by Takeuti in terms of "ordinal diagrams", and which is bounded by ψ0(Ωω) in Buchholz's notation. And also the ordinal of MLW, Martin-Löf type theory with indexed W-Types .
IDω, the theory of ω-iterated inductive definitions. Its proof-theoretic ordinal is equal to the Takeuti-Feferman-Buchholz ordinal.
KPi, an extension of Kripke–Platek set theory based on a recursively inaccessible ordinal, has a very large proof-theoretic ordinal  described in a 1983 paper of Jäger and Pohlers, where I is the smallest inaccessible.
MLM, an extension of Martin-Löf type theory by one Mahlo-universe, has an even larger proof-theoretic ordinal ψΩ1(ΩM + ω).

Most theories capable of describing the power set of the natural numbers have proof-theoretic ordinals that are so large that no explicit combinatorial description has yet been given. This includes , full second-order arithmetic and set theories with powersets including ZF and ZFC. The strength of intuitionistic ZF (IZF) equals that of ZF.

Table of ordinal analyses

Key 
This is a list of symbols used in this table:

 ψ represents Buchholz's psi unless stated otherwise.
 Ψ represents either Rathjen's or Stegert's Psi.
 φ represents Veblen's function.
 ω represents the first transfinite ordinal.
 εα represents the epsilon numbers.
 Γα represents the gamma numbers (Γ0 is the Feferman–Schütte ordinal)
 Ωα represent the uncountable ordinals (Ω1, abbreviated Ω, is ω1).

This is a list of the abbreviations used in this table:

 First-order arithmetic
  is Robinson arithmetic
  is the first-order theory of the nonnegative part of a discretely ordered ring.
  is rudimentary function arithmetic.
  is arithmetic with induction restricted to Δ0-predicates without any axiom asserting that exponentiation is total.
  is elementary function arithmetic.
  is arithmetic with induction restricted to Δ0-predicates augmented by an axiom asserting that exponentiation is total.
  is elementary function arithmetic augmented by an axiom ensuring that each element of the n-th level  of the Grzegorczyk hierarchy is total.
  is  augmented by an axiom ensuring that each element of the n-th level  of the Grzegorczyk hierarchy is total.
  is primitive recursive arithmetic.
  is arithmetic with induction restricted to Σ1-predicates.
  is Peano arithmetic.
  is  but with induction only for positive formulas.
  extends PA by ν iterated fixed points of monotone operators.
  is not exactly a first-order arithmetic system, but captures what one can get by predicative reasoning based on the natural numbers.
  extends PA by ν iterated least fixed points of monotone operators.
  is not exactly a first-order arithmetic system, but captures what one can get by predicative reasoning based on ν-times iterated generalized inductive definitions.
  is a weakened version of  based on W-types.
 Second-order arithmetic
  is a second order form of  sometimes used in reverse mathematics.
  is a second order form of  sometimes used in reverse mathematics.
  is recursive comprehension.
  is weak König's lemma.
  is arithmetical comprehension.
  is  plus the full second-order induction scheme.
  is arithmetical transfinite recursion.
  is  plus the full second-order induction scheme.
  is  plus the assertion "every true -sentence with parameters holds in a (countable coded) -model of ".
 Kripke-Platek set theory
  is Kripke-Platek set theory with the axiom of infinity.
  is Kripke-Platek set theory, whose universe is an admissible set containing .
  is a weakened version of  based on W-types.
  asserts that the universe is a limit of admissible sets.
  is a weakened version of  based on W-types.
  asserts that the universe is inaccessible sets.
  asserts that the universe is hyperinaccessible: an inaccessible set and a limit of inaccessible sets.
  asserts that the universe is a Mahlo set.
  is  augmented by a certain first-order reflection scheme.
  is KPi augmented by the axiom .
  is KPI augmented by the assertion "at least one recursively Mahlo ordinal exists". 

A superscript zero indicates that -induction is removed (making the theory significantly weaker).

 Type theory
  is the Herbelin-Patey Calculus of Primitive Recursive Constructions.
  is type theory without W-types and with  universes.
  is type theory without W-types and with finitely many universes.
  is type theory with a next universe operator.
  is type theory without W-types and with a superuniverse.
 is an automorphism on type theory without W-types.
  is type theory with one universe and Aczel's type of iterative sets.
  is type theory with indexed W-Types.
  is type theory with W-types and one universe.
  is type theory with W-types and finitely many universes.
 is an automorphism on type theory with W-types.
  is type theory with a Mahlo universe.
 Constructive set theory
  is Aczel's constructive set theory.
  is  plus the regular extension axiom.
  is  plus the full-second order induction scheme.
 Explicit mathematics
  is basic explicit mathematics plus elementary comprehension
  is  plus join rule
  is  plus join axioms
  is a weak variant of the Feferman's .

See also 
Equiconsistency
Large cardinal property
Feferman–Schütte ordinal
Bachmann–Howard ordinal
Complexity class
Gentzen's consistency proof

Notes 
1.For 
2.The Veblen function  with countably infinitely iterated least fixed points.
4.Uses Madore's ψ rather than Buchholz's ψ.
6. represents the first recursively weakly compact ordinal. Uses Arai's ψ rather than Buchholz's ψ.
8. represents the first inaccessible cardinal. Uses Jäger's ψ rather than Buchholz's ψ.
9. represents the limit of the -inaccessible cardinals. Uses (presumably) Jäger's ψ.
10.represents the limit of the -inaccessible cardinals. Uses (presumably) Jäger's ψ.
11. represents the first Mahlo cardinal. Uses Rathjen's ψ rather than Buchholz's ψ.
12. represents the first weakly compact cardinal. Uses Rathjen's Ψ rather than Buchholz's ψ.
13. represents the first -indescribable cardinal. Uses Stegert's Ψ rather than Buchholz's ψ.
14. is the smallest  such that ' is -indescribable') and ' is -indescribable '). Uses Stegert's Ψ rather than Buchholz's ψ.
15. represents the first Mahlo cardinal. Uses (presumably) Rathjen's ψ.

Citations

References

 

Proof theory
Ordinal numbers